Madras Rouge (The Red Madras Headdress) is a painting by Henri Matisse from 1907. The woman depicted is the painter's wife, Amélie Noellie Parayre Matisse.

The painting was illustrated in Gelett Burgess, "The Wild Men of Paris", The Architectural Record, May 1910, New York.

References

1907 paintings
Collection of the Barnes Foundation
Paintings by Henri Matisse